Orland was a Southern Pacific Railway station in Orland, California. The Southern Pacific had built the line out from Colusa County by 1880 when the railroad assumed management of the town. The Klamath served the station as late as 1954, and ran between Portland and Oakland, but the stop did not appear in the 1966 timetables. After Amtrak took over nationwide passenger operations, the state lobbied the company in 1974 to add the station as a stop on the Coast Starlight route, running daily from Los Angeles to Seattle. While the station saw service for a time, it was bypassed in 1982. The station building was subsequently moved to Glenn County Fairgrounds.

References

Former Amtrak stations in California
Former Southern Pacific Railroad stations in California
Railway stations in the United States opened in 1974
Railway stations closed in 1982
Transportation buildings and structures in Glenn County, California